Humanap Ka ng Panget is a 1991 Filipino comedy film co-written and directed by Ben Feleo.It stars Jimmy Santos and Keempee de Leon, with rapper Andrew E. in his acting debut. It also stars Eddie Gutierrez, Carmi Martin, Gelli de Belen, Nanette Medved, Dennis Padilla, and Kate Gomez. Named after the pop rap song of the same name by Andrew E., the film was released by Viva Films on March 14, 1991.

Plot
The story focuses on three brothers: Big Boy, Andy E., and Elvin. They live in the slums of Manila as "bakal-dyaryo-bote" scavengers recycling scrap metal, newspapers and empty beverage bottles. Later on, They discover that Big Boy, the ugliest of the three brothers, is the only heir of a rich yet ugly tycoon in Manila (Zorayda Sanchez) who was lucky enough to marry the wealthy man Ernesto.

Big Boy also took his adopted brothers and adoptive parents with him when his biological parents took him in and it was a stroke of luck for both Andy (because he became a rap superstar) and Elvin (who was able to go to college, a wish he is longing for).

Cast
Jimmy Santos as Big Boy
Andrew E. as Andy E.
Eddie Gutierrez as Ernesto
Carmi Martin as Fifi
Gelli de Belen as Anna
Keempee de Leon as Elvin
Nanette Medved as Nathasia
Dennis Padilla as Edu
Kate Gomez as Kate
Dencio Padilla as Jonathan
Ruby Rodriguez as Gracia
Jinky Oda as Tale
Yoyoy Villame as Cyrano
Zorayda Sanchez as Luningning
Jon Achaval as doctor of Luningning
Dexter Doria as Mrs. Arellano
Odette Khan as Cleo
Ben Johnson as Head Doctor
Wilson Go as priest
Paeng Giant as father of Big Boy
Judith 
Eddie Mapile
Rey Tumenes
Ronald Asinas
Gerry Sacdalan
Rommel Lavado
Erning Santos
Richard Santos

Sharon Cuneta makes a cameo appearance near the end.

References

1991 films
1991 comedy films
Filipino-language films
Films based on songs
Philippine comedy films
1990s Tagalog-language films
Viva Films films
Films directed by Ben Feleo